The Islamic State of Iraq and the Levant (ISIL) is proscribed as a terrorist organisation by the United Kingdom. British citizens have fought as members of the group, and there has been political debate on how to punish them. On 26 September 2014, Parliament voted to begin Royal Air Force airstrikes against ISIL in northern Iraq at the request of the Iraqi government, which began four days later, using Tornado GR4 jets. On 2 December 2015, the UK Parliament authorised an extension to the Royal Air Force airstrike campaign, joining the US-led international coalition against ISIL in Syria. Hours after the vote, Royal Air Force Tornado jets began bombing ISIL-controlled oilfields.

British citizens in ISIL
William Hague, then Foreign Secretary, estimated in June 2014 that 400 British citizens were fighting in Syria, some for ISIL. Khalid Mahmood, a Labour MP, estimated that there were at least 1,500 Britons in ISIL. A more accurate source from the BBC estimates around 850 people from the UK had traveled to Iraq and Syria to support or fight for jihadist groups. Former MI6 counter-terrorism head Richard Barrett raised concerns about the potentially large number of radicalised fighters that had returned to Britain from Syria and Iraq.

Journalist James Foley was executed around 19 August 2014, on video by an ISIL member whose accent sounded English. The killer, Mohammed Emwazi, was described in the media as "Jihadi John".

In August 2014, activists in London handed out leaflets in support of ISIL outside the busy Oxford Circus branch of Topshop.

On 7 September 2015, a Royal Air Force MQ-9 Reaper drone conducted an airstrike in Syria which killed two British-born ISIL fighters.

On 24 October 2017, it was announced that a British man who had been fighting against Isil with the Kurdish YPG in Raqqa had been killed whilst trying to clear land mines. This took the total number of British volunteers fighting Isis in Syria to six.

A British citizen, Shamima Begum entered Syria to join ISIL at the age of 15. She visited Syria in February 2015 with two of her friends. But, Begum got married to an ISIL member within 10 days of reaching Syria. In July 2020, the British Supreme Court allowed Begum to come back for proper investigation of the case in the UK. But, on 26 February 2021, the Supreme Court declared reversing the decision for court appeal and her return to the UK. On 22 February 2023, Shamima Begum also lost the legal case for her British Citizenship at the Special Immigration Appeals Commission(SIAC). The case was dismissed for national security of the country. Sir James Eadie KC indicated that Begum “poses a risk of National Security”.

Reactions
The British government proscribed ISIL as a terrorist organisation in June 2014. Previously, it had been proscribed as a part of Al-Qaeda. The government describes the group as follows:

In August 2014, British Prime Minister David Cameron suggested that anybody displaying the black standard in the United Kingdom should be arrested.

Home Secretary Theresa May suggested new measures against radical preachers, stripping citizenship from naturalised Britons who fought for ISIL, and trying British-born ISIL members for engaging in terrorism abroad. Other figures, such as Mayor of London Boris Johnson, Conservative backbench MP David Davis, former archbishop of Canterbury Lord Carey and UKIP leader Nigel Farage have stated that all British citizens in ISIS should lose their citizenship. On 29 August 2014, the UK terror threat was raised from "substantial" to "severe".

Sir Malcolm Rifkind, a senior MP, advocated an alliance with President Bashar al-Assad of Syria to defeat ISIL. This was ruled out by Foreign Secretary Philip Hammond, who stated "We may very well find that we are aligned against a common enemy. But that does not make us able to trust them, it does not make us able to work with them and it would poison what we are trying to achieve in separating moderate Sunni opinion from the poisonous ideology of [ISIS] if we were to align ourselves with President Assad."

Royal Air Force Tornado jets and Chinook helicopters based in Cyprus have provided humanitarian aid to Yazidi refugees fleeing ISIL, as well as airlifts.

See also
 The Beatles (terrorist cell)

References

Foreign relations of the United Kingdom
British involvement in the Syrian civil war